Richard Meikle (10 October 1929 – 2 June 1991) was an Australian actor who worked extensively in film, theatre, and radio. He was the father of writer Sam Meikle.

Career
Meikle began his career as a stage actor. His first recorded role was in Metropolitan Theatre's production of Ned Kelly in 1947.

In the 1950s, Meikle moved into radio acting, most prominently with Grace Gibson Radio Productions. Meikle's voice landed him many major roles with the company as both an actor and an announcer. Meikle was included in Reg James' list of his favourite Grace Gibson performances for his starring role alongside John Unicomb in the serial Becket. Another factor working in Meikle's favour was his ability and desire to perform his own sound effects. Grace Gibson Productions' budget did not cover a professional sound effects person and as such actors who could do effects themselves were highly sought after. Reg James noted Meikle would often compete for rights to do sound effects with his co-stars Ron Roberts and James Condon.

Meikle played London-based spy Guy Marriott. 1966 produced several roles for Meikle. He was used in the dual role of actor and announcer in The Shame of Sefton Ridge, an adaptation of Hamilton Basso's novel The View from Pompey's Head. Meikle read the opening credits and played the character of Mickey Higgens. Meikle's other role that year was that of henchman Paul Kruger in another Phillip Mann drama The Red Gardenia. Meikle also read the end credits of a few episodes. Another major role in the 60s for Meikle was as Logan Berkeley in Ross Napier's adaptation of the novel Borrasca. Borrasca was another example of Grace Gibson using Meikle as an announcer.

The early 1970s also proved to be a busy time for Meikle with Grace Gibson. He had another actor/announcer job in the form of Ross Napier's So Help Me God in 1970, where he read the credits for each episode and played criminal Toby Laird. Meikle had starring roles in the 1971 shows I Killed Grace Random and I, Christopher Macaulay, where he played copywriter Curtis Miller and the titular character respectively.

As television started to become more prevalent, Meikle began to branch out in the late 1970s. He appeared in several television movies, including Harvest of Hate, where he replaced Sir Robert Helpmann in the role of vineyard owner John Camden. In 1976, Meikle had a major role as Martin Gruman in the one hour pilot episode of the television drama Bluey.

In 1982, Meikle returned to Grace Gibson and joined the cast of Grace Gibson's most popular serial, The Castlereagh Line. Meikle played Jim Holly.

Personal life
Richard was the son of Leslie Meikle, an engineer, and Alma May Meikle. Richard married twice: in 1955 to Lola Edna Brooks, an actress, with whom he had a son. He married again in 1968, to Helen Millicent Madgwick, by whom he had another four children.
Richard's obituary appeared in the Sydney Morning Herald on 4 June 1991.

Filmography

References

External links

Richard Meikle Australian theatre credits at AusStage
Richard Meikle at National Film and Sound Archive

1929 births
1991 deaths
20th-century Australian male actors